Palestine Square or Midan Falasteen is a city square in central Gaza City, State of Palestine, in between Jamal Abdel Nasser Street and Omar Mukhtar Street. It is the location of a bus station, a taxi station, a fruit market, a hospital, and dozens of small shops and vendors. Gaza's municipal headquarters is also located in the square. Palestine Square once was walled when it laid along the southern edge of the Old City, overlooking barley and vegetable farms, olive and almond groves.

References

Bibliography

Squares in Gaza City